Jack P. Sullivan (2 April 1919 – 19 June 1990) was an Australian rules footballer who played with Richmond in the Victorian Football League (VFL).

Sullivan, recruited from Ormond Amateur, started out at Richmond as a centre half-forward but was later used in the ruck and at centre half-back. It was as a centre half-back that Sullivan played in the 1942 VFL Grand Final, but he wasn't able to steer his side to a win. He didn't feature at all in the 1944 and 1945 seasons, then played the first six rounds in 1946, before transferring to Williamstown. From 1947 to 1950, Sullivan was captain-coach of Hobart and led them to a TANFL premiership in the last of those years. He won the William Leitch Medal in 1947 and represented Tasmania at the 1950 Brisbane Carnival.

References

1919 births
1990 deaths
Australian rules footballers from Victoria (Australia)
Richmond Football Club players
Ormond Amateur Football Club players
Williamstown Football Club players
Hobart Football Club players
Hobart Football Club coaches
William Leitch Medal winners